Akperan Orshi Polytechnic, Yandev is a tertiary institution in Yandev near Gboko, Benue State, Nigeria. 
The college dates back to 1926 when the British colonial government established a farm training center at Yandev, then in Tiv province of the Northern Region.
In 1973, the Benue-Plateau State government upgraded the center to a school of Agriculture with an initial enrollment of 23 students. In 1983, the Department of Agriculture of the Murtala College of Arts, Science and Technology, Makurdi was merged with the school. In April 1991, the school was renamed the Akperan Orshi College of Agriculture, Yandev after Dr. James Akperan Orshi, the late monarch of  the Tiv nation. The college now has over 2,000 students on a campus that covers 231 hectares.

Courses 
The institution offers various courses under five Faculties/Schools. These are:

School of Agricultural Management and Vocational Studies,

School of Agricultural Production and Engineering Technology,

School of Animal Technology,

School of Basic Sciences and Foundation Studies,

and the School of Forestry and Fisheries Technology.

Selected publications
Selected publications authored by members of the faculty:

See also
List of polytechnics in Nigeria

References

External links 
 https://www.aocay.edu.ng/

Education in Benue State
Agricultural universities and colleges in Nigeria
Polytechnics in Nigeria
1926 establishments in Nigeria
Educational institutions established in 1926
Academic libraries in Nigeria